Noise is the fourth studio album of the London-based trip hop band Archive.

Track listing
 "Noise" – 6:42  		
 "Fuck U" – 5:14  		
 "Waste" – 9:57  	
 "Sleep" – 6:51  		
 "Here" – 1:02  		
 "Get Out" – 4:30  	
 "Conscience" – 4:17  	
 "Pulse" – 4:50  		
 "Wrong" – 0:56  	 	
 "Love Song" – 6:20  	
 "Me and You" – 8:00
 "Get Out (radio mix)" - 3:59

Bonus DVD
 Again (DVD)
 Men Like You (DVD)
 Gangsters (DVD)
 Conscience (DVD)
 St Malo (DVD)

Personnel
 Vocals - Craig Walker
 Guitar, Harmonica, Percussion  - Danny Griffiths
 Bass, Programming - Darius Keeler
 Guitar - Steve Harris (tracks: 2, 4, 10), Pete Barraclough (tracks: 3), James Tonkin (tracks: 4, 6)
 Drums - Tavis "Smiley" Nedd, Matt Martin
 Bass - Lee Pomeroy (tracks: 1, 2, 4, 7), Carl Holt (tracks: 3, 10, 11)
 Hammond - Steve Watts (tracks: 1, 3, 4, 8)
 Strings -  (tracks: 2, 3, 4, 7, 8)

Charts

References

2004 albums
Archive (band) albums
East West Records albums